The Bencao gangmu,  known in English as the Compendium of Materia Medica or Great Pharmacopoeia, is an encyclopedic gathering of medicine, natural history, and Chinese herbology compiled and edited by Li Shizhen and published in the late 16th century, during the Ming dynasty. Its first draft was completed in 1578 and printed in Nanjing in 1596. The Compendium lists the materia medica of traditional Chinese medicine known at the time, including plants, animals, and minerals that were believed to have medicinal properties. Over the centuries it was reprinted, translated, and cited widely. In the twentieth century it was adopted as a basis for Traditional Chinese Medicine.

Li compiled his entries not only from hundreds of earlier works in the bencao medical tradition, but from literary and historical texts. He reasoned that a poem might have better value that a medical work and that a tale of the strange could illustrate a drug's effects.

Name
The title, translated as "Materia Medica, Arranged according to Drug Descriptions and Technical Aspects", uses two Chinese compound words. Bencao (Ban-chao; "roots and herbs; based on herbs, pharmacopeia, materia medica") combines ben ( 'origin, basis') and cao ( 'grass, plant, herb'). Gangmu (Kang-mu; 'detailed outline; table of contents') combines gang (kang;  'main rope, hawser; main threads, essential principles') and mu ( 'eye, look; category, division').

History
Li Shizhen travelled widely for field study, combed through more than 800 works of literature, and compiled material from the copious historical bencao literature. He modelled his work on a Song dynasty compilation, especially its use of non-medical texts. He worked for more than three decades, with the help of his son, Li Jianyuan, who drew the illustrations. He finished a draft of the text in 1578, the printer began to carve the blocks in 1593, but it was not published until 1596, three years after Li died. Li Jianyuan  presented a copy to the Ming dynasty emperor, who saw it but did not pay much attention. Further editions were then published in 1603, 1606, 1640, and then in many editions, with increasing numbers of illustrations, down to the 21st century.

Contents
 The text consists of 1,892 entries, each entry with its own name called a gang. The mu in the title refers to the synonyms of each name.

The Compendium has 53 volumes in total:

The opening table of contents lists entries, including 1,160 hand drawn diagrams and illustrations.
Volume 1 to 4 – an index and a comprehensive list of herbs to treat the most common sicknesses.
Volume 5 to 53 – the main text, contains 1,892 distinct herbs, of which 374 were added by Li Shizhen.  There are 11,096 side prescriptions to treat common illness (8,160 of which are compiled in the text).

The text is written in almost 2 million Chinese characters, classified into 16 divisions and 60 orders.  For every herb there are entries on their names, a detailed description of their appearance and odor, nature, medical function, side effects, recipes, etc.

Errors 
The text contains information that was proven to be wrong due to Li's limited scientific and technical knowledge. For example, it is claimed that lead is not toxic.

Evaluation 
The British historian Joseph Needham writes about the Compendium in his Science and Civilisation in China.

The text provided classification of how traditional medicine was compiled and formatted, as well as biology classification of both plants and animals.

The text corrected some mistakes in the knowledge of herbs and diseases at the time. Several new herbs and more details from experiments were also included. It also has notes and records on general medical data and medical history.

The text includes information on pharmaceutics, biology, chemistry, geography, mineralogy, geology, history, and even mining and astronomy.

See also 
Chinese herbology
Mellified Man
Pharmacognosy
Yaoxing Lun

References

Bibliography

 (Review, Edward B. Jelks)
 .

External links

Chinese source text at zh.wikisource.org
Pen ts'ao kang mu (The Great Herbal), page from 1672 edition, National Library of Medicine

Ming dynasty literature
Chinese medical texts
Pharmacological classification systems
1578 books
Memory of the World Register
Pharmacopoeias
Memory of the World Register in China